Steve Greenberg is an American record producer currently heading the S-Curve Records label.  He also manages the pop band AJR and is the host/writer of the podcast "Speed of Sound".

He is noted for "discovering" popular musical acts such as Hanson, Baha Men, Jonas Brothers, Joss Stone and AJR. He received a 2000 Grammy Award in the "Best Dance Recording" category as a producer of "Who Let the Dogs Out?" by Baha Men. Greenberg also won a 2019 Grammy Award in the "Best Album Notes" category for his essay featured in the "Stax '68: A Memphis Story" boxed set. From 2005 to 2006, he served as the president of Columbia Records, where he produced the debut album by the Jonas Brothers. Prior to founding S-Curve Records, he was Head of Artists & Repertoire for Mercury Records, where he served as executive producer of Hanson's single "Mmmbop", which spent three weeks at number one on the Billboard Hot 100 chart, and their debut album Middle of Nowhere.

S-Curve's roster/catalog includes Duran Duran, Andy Grammer, 'Hamilton' star Leslie Odom Jr., 2018 Eurovision winner Netta Barzilai, reggae artist Conkarah, Tinted Windows, Fountains of Wayne, Nikki Jean, We The Kings, Joss Stone, A-WA, Betty Wright, Little Jackie, Tom Jones, Daisy the Great, Care Bears On Fire, David Broza, Rachel Crow, Broadway star Joshua Henry, A Great Big World, Maxi Priest and Diane Birch.

Greenberg co-produced Andy Grammer's triple-platinum single "Honey I'm Good", which was one of the 10 biggest-selling singles of 2015, according to Soundscan and did additional production on Grammer's debut platinum-certified single "Keep Your Head Up". Together with Betty Wright and Michael Mangini, he produced  Joss Stone's "The Soul Sessions" and "Mind Body & Soul" albums, the latter which received a Grammy nomination for "Best Pop Album" in 2005. This same production troika produced the 2009 debut album by Diane Birch, Bible Belt. Greenberg also co-produced with Wright and Mangini two tracks on Tom Jones's 2008 album "24 Hours," and the 2019 O'Jays' album "The Last Word," the latter of which was co-produced by Sam Hollander.   He was co-Executive Producer of "Betty Wright: The Movie" by Betty Wright and The Roots, which was nominated for a 2011 Grammy in the Best Traditional R&B Performance category. In 2012, he co-produced and executive produced Joss Stone's "The Soul Sessions: Vol. II," the long-awaited sequel to her debut album. "The Soul Sessions: Vol. II" reached the Top 10 on both the U.S. and U.K album charts. He co-produced Care Bears On Fire's single "Everybody Else" with S*A*M and Sluggo.

In 2013, he produced several tracks on Diane Birch's "Speak a Little Louder" album. He also traveled to Jerusalem to co-produce, with Steve Earle, the album "East Jerusalem/West Jerusalem" by the Israeli singer David Broza, backed by a half-Israeli, half-Palestinian ensemble. He appears in the documentary film on the making of "East Jerusalem/West Jerusalem."  That year, he also began managing the band AJR whose debut single "I'm Ready", was certified Platinum in the U.S. and Australia, and who have subsequently has hits with songs from their albums "The Click",  "Neotheater", and "OK Orchestra". 

He has co-written songs for Joss Stone, Jonas Brothers, Boyzone, Baha Men, The O'Jays, Leslie Odom, Jr. and others.

He was also nominated for Grammy Awards in 1992 in the "Best Historical Album" category as producer of "The Complete Stax/Volt Singles 1959-1968" boxed-set and in 1995 in the "Best Album Notes" category for "Otis! the Essential Otis Redding.  

In 2020, Greenberg launched the pop music history podcast "Speed of Sound," produced by iHeart Media. Greenberg is the host, writer and co-producer of the podcast. 

He contributed the chapter on Sugarhill Records to the book "The Vibe Magazine History of Hip Hop" (1999) and the chapter on pop music in the 1980s to the collection "Living In the '80's" (Gil Troy, ed.), published by Oxford University Press (2009).

In 2014, he published his first book, called "How the Beatles Went Viral In '64", about the Beatles' rise to U.S stardom. The book was excerpted as a cover story in Billboard magazine in January, 2014.

In the early 1980s, he was a DJ on the Voice of Peace radio station off the coast of Israel and was a news correspondent for Israel Radio, based in Tel Aviv. He holds an M.A. in Applied Communication Research from Stanford University and a B.A in International Relations from American University.

In 2020, he won the Grammy Award for "Best Album Notes" for Stax Records album, Stax ’68: A Memphis Story.

References

Further reading
 Mendelsohn, Jennifer "Young, Rich and Hanson", USA Weekend, August 22-24, 1997 retrieved December 4. 2004
 Wolf, Jaime "The Godson Of Soul", New York Magazine, May 20, 1991, page 28
 Greenberg, Steve "How The Beatles Went Viral: Blunders, Technology & Luck Broke The Fab Four in America", Billboard, February 7, 2014

American record producers
American chief executives
Grammy Award winners
Offshore radio broadcasters
Living people
Year of birth missing (living people)